The CU Triathlon Team is a sports team at the University of Colorado Boulder that competes in the sport of triathlon. The club was created in 1993 and has won 18 USA Triathlon Collegiate National Championships. As a team, they compete at the USA Triathlon's Collegiate National Championship as well as other selected competitions throughout the year.

The team competes in the Mountain Collegiate Triathlon Conference, a 12 club association of colleges and universities in the region.

Team performance
The team currently has 18 USA Triathlon Collegiate National Championship titles awarded as a combined men's and women's team score, which is 4x more championships than all other teams combined. Since the inception of the Collegiate National Championship title in 1992 the team has placed:

1994: National Champions
1995: 2nd place
1996: National Champions
1997: National Champions
1998: National Champions
1999: National Champions
2000: National Champions
2001: 2nd Place
2002: National Champions
2003: National Champions
2004: National Champions
2005: National Champions
2006: 3rd Place
2007: 3rd Place
2008: 2nd Place
2009: 3rd Place
2010: National Champions
2011: National Champions
2012: National Champions
2013: National Champions
2014: National Champions
2015: National Champions
2016 National Champions
2017: National Champions
2018: 2nd Place
2019: 3rd Place

Coaches
Rick Ellison: 1996-1998
Neal Henderson: 1999-2000
Bettina Younge: 2001-2002
Ryan Ignatz: 2003
Matt Eagan: 2004
Kirk Nelson: 2007-2008
Mike Ricci: 2009-2013
Dave Sheanin: 2014
Brad Seng: 2014-current

See also
Columbia Multisport club

References

External links
Official website
USATriathlon.com
Mountain Collegiate Triathlon Conference
FrozenFoot5k.com - Team fundraiser

Triathlon organizations
University of Colorado Boulder
Sports in Boulder, Colorado
Colorado Buffaloes